Kolarai (also Romanized as Kolarā’ī; also known as Kalleh Rāhī) is a village in Sand-e Mir Suiyan Rural District, Dashtiari District, Chabahar County, Sistan and Baluchestan Province, Iran. At the 2006 census, its population was 275, with 62 families.

References 

Populated places in Chabahar County